KZZY (103.5 FM, "Double Z Country") is an American commercial radio station licensed to serve Devils Lake, North Dakota.  The station is owned by Double Z Broadcasting, Inc., and operated along with its three sister stations under the collective name Lake Region Radio Works. It airs a country music format.

The station was assigned the KZZY call letters by the Federal Communications Commission.

References

External links
KZZY official website

ZZY
Country radio stations in the United States
Ramsey County, North Dakota
Radio stations established in 1960